The Maine Black Bears baseball team is the varsity intercollegiate baseball program of the University of Maine, located in Orono, Maine. It is the university's oldest athletic program, having begun play in 1881. It has been a member of the NCAA Division I America East Conference since its founding (as the North Atlantic Conference) at the start of the 1990 season. Its home venue is Mahaney Diamond, located on the university's campus. Nick Derba is the head coach. He was named interim head coach prior to the 2017 season. The program has appeared in 16 NCAA Tournaments and seven College World Series. In conference postseason play, it has won eight ECAC Tournaments and five America East Tournaments. In conference regular season play, it has won five America East titles (three of those when the league was known as the North Atlantic Conference). 19 former Black Bears have appeared in Major League Baseball.

History

Early history
The University of Maine opened in fall 1868 as the Maine College of Agriculture and the Mechanic Arts. The baseball program, founded in 1881, was the school's first intercollegiate athletic program. It went 3–3 in its first season. The program continued to play a handful of games each season during the 1880s; during this time, Irv Ray, Maine's first alumnus to play in Major League Baseball, played for the program. It played its first 10-game schedule in 1886 and won 10 games for the first time in 1888. The university did not sponsor a baseball team in 1892, but the team resumed in 1893.

From the program's inception through the 1893 season, student coaches coached the team. For the 1894 season, the school hired Harry Miller as its first faculty head coach. In two seasons under Miller (1894 and 1895), the team went 5–7 and 8–4, respectively. Jack Abbott, the program's second head coach, led the team to a 5–4 record in 1896. Under W. W. Bustard, Maine had consecutive 9–4 seasons in 1897 and 1898. The university changed its name from the Maine College of Agriculture and the Mechanic Arts to its current name following the 1897 season.

Through the end of the 1923 season, Maine competed as an independent school. During this time, its highest single-season win total was 11, a mark reached three times (twice under head coach William Magill). Eight future major leaguers played for the program: Clarence Blethen, Harvey Cushman, Michael Driscoll, Pat French, Otis Lawry, Marty McHale, Ralph Pond, and Harland Rowe.  In 1902, the team played an exhibition game against the New York Giants at the Polo Grounds.

The longest-tenured head coach of the period was former Philadelphia Athletics player Monte Cross, who coached the team for six seasons (1916–1921) and had an overall record of 33–33–3. An April 1916 Lewiston Daily Sun article said of Cross, "His easy-going, but nevertheless strict instructions and discipline, together with the knowledge of the inside features of the National game, and the manner in which he teaches them, make an everlasting impression on the students, players, and managers." In 1919, Cross became the first Maine baseball coach to receive the "M" award from the university's president.

After Joseph Murphy coached the program from 1924–1925, a total of two coaches led the team until 1949. Murphy assistant Fred Brice was the program's head coach for 10 seasons (1926–1935), and William Kenyon held the position for 13 seasons (1936–1943, 1945–1949). Under Brice, Maine had a 67–60 record; its best single-season record during his tenure was 9–5 in 1932. For the previous season, 1931, the baseball team had moved to a location behind Memorial Gym after previously playing at Alumni Field. In the mid-1930s, 1936 Olympian Clarence Keegan played for Brice.  Under Kenyon, Maine went 61–91–1. It went 11–7 in 1938 to tie the program record for wins and won Maine State Series championships in 1937 and 1942.

From 1937–1943, Maine played in the New England Conference, along with Connecticut, Rhode Island State, New Hampshire, and Northeastern.  Maine won the conference championship in 1938, but in the conference's seven seasons of baseball competition, it had the worst overall record among the five teams.

Yankee Conference
From 1949 to 1979, Maine played in the Yankee Conference. For the majority of its time in the conference, its fellow members were Connecticut, Massachusetts, New Hampshire, Rhode Island, and Vermont.  In 31 seasons in the league, Maine had the third-highest winning percentage (.548), behind Connecticut and Massachusetts.

Maine won its first Yankee championship in 1950 under head coach Mike Lude but did not win another in that decade. It began to have more success after Jack Butterfield was named head coach for the start of the 1957 season.  Butterfield had played at Maine in the early 1950s and served as an assistant in 1956.  In his fourth season, 1960, Maine shared the Yankee title with Connecticut after both went 8–2 in conference.  Baseball executive Bill Livesey featured on the 1960 championship team.

In 1964, the Black Bears went 21–8, won the Yankee Conference, and reached their first College World Series (CWS).  Maine swept Northeastern in the best-of-three District 1 Regional to reach Omaha.  Maine began the tournament 1–1, beating Seton Hall in the opener but losing to Minnesota in the 1–0 game.  In the losers bracket, Maine defeated Arizona State (also playing in its first CWS) and defending champion USC.  In the semi-finals, Maine was eliminated by a 2–1 loss to Missouri.  Pitcher Joe Ferris was named the Most Outstanding Player.

Butterfield led the team through the end of the 1974 season, when he left to coach South Florida, in part because of disagreements with Maine's administration about the program's funding.  In his final decade, Maine shared two more Yankee titles and had another 20-win season, but it did not return to the NCAA Tournament.  Butterfield finished with an overall Maine record of 240–169–2.

Maine hired Colby head coach John Winkin as Butterfield's replacement. Winkin went on to lead the team for 22 seasons (1975–1996) and was Maine's most successful head coach. He had an overall record of 642–430–3 and led Maine to 10 NCAA Tournaments and 6 College World Series.  His teams included nine future Major League Baseball players: Mike Bordick, Kevin Buckley, Fred Howard, Joe Johnson, Jeff Plympton, Bert Roberge, Mark Sweeney, Bill Swift, and Larry Thomas.

After making an NCAA Regional in Winkin's first season, Maine reached the 1976 College World Series.  There, it went 2–2.  After losing its opener, 3–2, to Eastern Michigan, the team knocked out Auburn and Washington State before being eliminated.  Maine returned to the CWS in 1981, when it had its first 30-win season.  After defeating St. John's in the Northeast Regional finals, the Black Bears went 0–2 in Omaha.

The 1981 appearance was the first of four consecutive trips to Omaha, winning the Northeast Regional (which it often hosted) on several occasions.  The Black Bears also reached the CWS in 1986, their first 40-win season.  At the CWS, the team went 0–2 in 1983, 1984, and 1986, but finished tied for third in 1982.  After losing its opener to Miami, it notched losers bracket wins against Cal State Fullerton, Wichita State, and Stanford before being knocked out by Miami.  Bob Whalen, who went on to become the head coach at Dartmouth, was an assistant to Winkin during these four appearances.

America East Conference
Maine joined the North Atlantic Conference for the 1990 season.  In its first four seasons in the conference, it reached three NCAA Tournaments (1990, 1991, 1993), losing to Clemson in the regional final in 1991.  Maine players won several major conference awards in the early 1990s, including a sweep of the Pitcher and Player of the Year (by Larry Thomas and Mark Sweeney) in 1991.

Winkin's contract was not renewed after the 1996 season, and the school hired Providence head coach Paul Kostacopoulos to replace him. (The North Atlantic was also renamed the America East after the 1996 season.)  Kostacopoulos led the team for nine seasons (1997–2005).  Maine's best season under him came in 2002, when the Black Bears went 40–17 (16–6 America East), won the conference's regular season and tournament titles, and reached the Los Angeles Regional.  The team also reached the 2005 NCAA Tournament under Kostacopoulos, who was twice named the America East Coach of the Year.

When Kostacopoulos left for Navy after the 2005 season, Maine hired Manhattan head coach Steve Trimper to replace him.  Trimper had previously coached in the America East as an assistant at Vermont in the 1990s.  Under him, Maine returned to the NCAA Tournament in 2006 and 2011, playing in the Chapel Hill Regional both times and winning a game in 2011.  In 2013, Trimper was named America East Coach of the Year, and the Black Bears won three of four major conference awards after winning the regular season title.  In the America East Tournament, the team lost to Binghamton in the championship game.

Conference membership
 Independent (1881–1891, 1893–1936, 1945–1948, 1980–1981)
 New England Conference (1937–1943)
 Yankee Conference (1949–1979)
 Eastern Collegiate Athletic Conference (1982–1989)
 North Division (1982–1989)
 America East Conference (1990–present)
 Known as the North Atlantic Conference from 1990–1997

Venues

Early venues
The program played at several locations on Maine's campus in its early seasons. During the 1910s and 1920s, it played at Alumni Field. In 1931, it moved to "a section directly behind Memorial gym."

Mahaney Diamond

The program currently plays at Mahaney Diamond, which opened in the early 1980s and is located on the northern end of the university's campus. It has a capacity of 4,400 spectators and is named for Maine alumnus and donor Larry Mahaney, who graduated from the university in 1951. The field has a FieldTurf surface, and the facility has been renovated many times since the mid 1980s.

The facility hosted NCAA Regionals in 1982, 1983, 1984, 1986, and 1991. It has also hosted four AEC Tournaments (1996, 2002, 2004 and 2018).

Coaches

Head coaches
Since Harry Miller became the program's first record head coach for the 1894 season, Maine has had 24 head coaches. John Winkin, who was Maine's head coach from 1975–1996, is both the program's longest tenured and winningest head coach. He coached for 22 seasons and won 642 games.